This is a list of slice of life anime.

References

Slice of life